Acacia ammobia, commonly known as the Mount Connor wattle, is a species of Acacia native to central Australia. It is regarded as rare in both South Australia and the Northern Territory where it is endemic.

Description
It has angular flattened glabrous branchlets that eventually become terete.

Taxonomy
The species was first formally described by the botanist John Maconochie in 1978 as part of the work Notes on the genus Acacia in the Northern Territory as published in the Journal of the Adelaide Botanic Gardens. It was reclassified as Racosperma ammobium by Leslie Pedley in 1986 then transferred back to the genus Acacia in 2001.
The specific epithet is taken from the Latin word ammobia meaning sand dweller in reference to the habitat.

Distribution
The shrub is found in arid parts of inland Australia where it has a limited distribution in the north-western parts of South Australia and southern parts of the Northern Territory where it is often situated on the upper slopes of hills and ranges growing in sandy or gravelly soils on upper slopes of ranges. Also found in the Northern Territory.

See also
List of Acacia species

References

External links 
 The Australasian Virtual Herbarium – Distribution of Acacia ammobia
WATTLE Acacias of Australia factsheet: Acacia ammobia

ammobia
Fabales of Australia
Flora of the Northern Territory
Flora of South Australia
Plants described in 1978